The Tick is an American streaming television series created for Amazon Prime Video by Ben Edlund, based on his comic book character of the same name. Its pilot premiered on August 18, 2016. A "half-season", through to the sixth episode, was released on August 25, 2017, and another six episodes were released on February 23, 2018. On January 17, 2018, Amazon ordered a second season of ten episodes, which premiered on April 5, 2019. A month later, Edlund revealed on Twitter that Amazon Video declined to renew the series for a third season.
In June 2019, Edlund said that he was unable to find a "new home" for the Tick, ending the series with two seasons.

Premise
The Tick is a nigh invulnerable superhero in a blue tick suit who arrives in the city to help combat crime and uncover the mysterious figure behind the city's underworld. He befriends a nervous and mild-mannered young man named Arthur who becomes his sidekick. They come to realize that an apparently long-dead supervillain called "The Terror" may still be pulling the strings in the city's underworld.

Cast

Main
 Peter Serafinowicz as The Tick
 Griffin Newman as Arthur Everest
 Valorie Curry as Dot Everest
 Brendan Hines as Superian
 Yara Martinez as Miss Lint/Janet/Joan of Arc
 Scott Speiser as Overkill/Straight Shooter/Esteban
 Jackie Earle Haley as The Terror (Season 1)

Recurring

 Michael Cerveris as Ramses IV
 Bryan Greenberg as Derek
 Alan Tudyk as the voice of Dangerboat
 Townsend Coleman as the voice of Midnight/Onward
 Kyle Catlett as young Arthur Everest
 Kahlil Ashanti as Goat
 Devin Ratray as Tinfoil Kevin
 Ryan Woodle as Clifford Richter/the Very Large Man ("V-L-M")
 Joshua Schubart as Frank
 Paul Moon as Khufu
 John Pirkis as Dr. Karamazov
 Richie Moriarty as Thomas Everest, Arthur and Dot's father
 Francois Chau as Walter/John Wu, Arthur and Dot's stepfather and an undercover AEGIS agent
 Patricia Kalember as Joan Everest, Arthur and Dot's mother
 Juliet Pritner as Gen. Julie McGinnis
 Dawn McGee as Hannity
 John Hodgman as Dr. Agent Hobbes / The Duke
 Marc Kudisch as Agent Tyrannosauras Rathbone
 Clé Bennett as Sage
 Adam Henry Garcia as Bronze Star
 Julian Cihi as Edgelord
 Steven Ogg as Flexon
 Niko Nedyalkov as Lobstercules (in-suit performer)
 Liz Vassey as the voice of Lobstercules
 Jayne Houdyshell as Black Market Bob

Episodes

Season 1 (2016–18)

Season 2 (2019)

Production
In March 2016, it was announced that Amazon Video had ordered a pilot for a The Tick reboot with Peter Serafinowicz starring as The Tick along with Griffin Newman as Arthur. Co-starring in the pilot would be Valorie Curry as Arthur's sister Dot and Brendan Hines as Superian. In April 2016, Jackie Earle Haley was cast as The Terror. In September 2016, Amazon Prime picked up the show for a full season of 12 episodes. Amazon ordered a second season of 10 episodes, which premiered on April 5, 2019. Amazon cancelled the series after two seasons. Creator Ben Edlund intended to shop the series around to other streaming services, but eventually announced he could not find a new home for the show before the contracts for the actors expired, thus officially ending the series.

Release
The pilot of The Tick premiered on Amazon Prime Video on August 18, 2016. The first six episodes of the first season were released on August 25, 2017 with the remaining six episodes being released on February 23, 2018. The entire second season was released on April 5, 2019.

Reception

Critical response
Review aggregation website Rotten Tomatoes reported a 90% approval rating with an average rating of 7.4/10 based on 63 critic reviews. The website's critical consensus reads, "Likeable characters add realism and heart to the tongue-in-cheek humor and high-octane action that fuels The Tick." Metacritic, which uses a weighted average, assigned a score of 72 out of 100, based on reviews from 23 critics, indicating "generally favorable reviews".

Rick Austin of Fortress of Solitude gave the show a score of 4/5 and felt that the show had managed to fix several of the flaws he saw in the pilot episode.  He concluded, "With so few good superhero comedies out there, this is exactly the show the world needs."

It has been suggested that the reason for the shows cancellation was that despite positive critical and audience reception, the show failed to draw enough viewership from the general audience to be sufficiently profitable. The show wasn't picked by another network "despite a substantial fan and crew campaign".

Accolades
In 2018 the series was nominated for a Saturn Award in the category "Best New Media Superhero Series".

Also in 2018, the show received an Emmy nomination for its Main Title music composed by Chris Bacon.

References

External links
 Official website
 

2010s American satirical television series
2010s American superhero comedy television series
2016 American television series debuts
2019 American television series endings
Amazon Prime Video original programming
American superhero television series
American superhero comedy television series
English-language television shows
Television shows based on comics
Television series by Amazon Studios
Television series by Sony Pictures Television
TV 2016